Fara (Old Norse: Færey ) is a small island in Orkney, Scotland, lying in Scapa Flow between the islands of Flotta and Hoy.  It has been uninhabited since the 1960s.

Footnotes 

Uninhabited islands of Orkney
Former populated places in Scotland